Alandan (also Romanized as Alandān; also known as ‘Alamdān) is a village in Chahardangeh Rural District, Chahardangeh District, Sari County, Mazandaran Province, Iran. At the 2006 census, its population was 319, in 89 families.

References 

Populated places in Sari County